Point Stadium is a baseball park in the eastern United States, located in Johnstown, Pennsylvania. The "Point" refers to its location at the confluence of the Little Conemaugh, Stonycreek, and Conemaugh rivers. It is home to the annual All-American Amateur Baseball Association (AAABA) national baseball tournament and the University of Pittsburgh at Johnstown's NCAA Division II college baseball team. It is also a venue for football, primarily at the high school level. The Johnstown Mill Rats, a collegiate summer baseball team in the Prospect League, began play at Point Stadium in 2021.

Original stadium
The original stadium opened in 1926 with a capacity of 17,000. The stadium featured an upper-deck on top of the grandstand. The Greater Johnstown High School football team regularly sold out the Point for their rivalry games against Windber High School and Altoona Area High School. The upper grandstand was later removed and capacity was reduced to 10,000. It was the home of numerous minor-league baseball teams and the All-American Amateur Baseball Association (AAABA) World Series baseball tournament.

The original Point Stadium had unusual field dimensions: fitted into a rectangular city block next to the Conemaugh River, it was just  down the right-field line and  down the left-field line, but bulged out to over  feet in center field, depending on the location of a snow fence which cut off the farthest reaches of the stadium in right center field. Huge nets were put in left field to keep balls in play, preventing easy home runs, and also to prevent balls from reaching the adjacent street.

The original Point Stadium's dimensions (1926–2002)
Left Field Line: 
Center Field: 
Right Field Line:

Current stadium
After nearly eight decades, the original structure was torn down in 2005 to make room for an $8 million renovation. The new 7,500-seat venue opened in 2006 on August 8, for a game between Johnstown and Chicago in the annual AAABA National Tournament. Bishop McCort High School currently plays its home football and baseball games here. Sportexe artificial turf was installed before the 2007 AAABA National Tournament. The turf was replaced once again after the 2021 AAABA National Tournament with fieldturf.

The current dimensions
Left Field Line: 
Left Center Field: 
Center Field: 
Right Center Field: 
Right Field Line: 

AAABA Hall of Fame

Point Stadium is home to the AAABA Hall of Fame which was established in the stadium in 1994.

UPJ Mountain Cats
Point Stadium is the home stadium for the University of Pittsburgh at Johnstown Mountain Cats college baseball team, an NCAA Division II program that competes in the Pennsylvania State Athletic Conference (PSAC). Prior to joining the PSAC in 2013–14, UPJ competed as a member of the West Virginia Intercollegiate Athletic Conference and hosted that conference's baseball championship tournament at Point Stadium in the 2008, 2009, 2010, and 2012 seasons. The Pennsylvania State Athletic Conference also held its conference baseball tournament at the stadium in 2010 and 2011.

Truman visit
During the last weeks of the presidential campaign in October 1948, President Harry Truman gave a major speech at

Popular culture
The movie All The Right Moves was filmed in Johnstown and featured Tom Cruise, Craig T. Nelson, and Lea Thompson. The high school football game scenes were shot at Point Stadium in the spring 

Bon Jovi played the stadium's only concert on June 16, 1989, as part of their Jersey Syndicate Tour with opener Skid Row.

Pittsburgh Steelers practices
The Pittsburgh Steelers have used the stadium for in-season practices and workouts, the last time being during the 1987 strike

References

External links
AAABA Johnstown – Point Stadium
City of Johnstown – Point Stadium
Photographs of Point Stadium - Rochester Area Ballparks

Baseball venues in Pennsylvania
Sports venues in Pennsylvania
High school football venues in the United States
Buildings and structures in Johnstown, Pennsylvania
Sports venues completed in 1926
Sports venues completed in 2006
College baseball venues in the United States
1926 establishments in Pennsylvania